Dr. Paul Carlton Borgman (born 1940) is an author of religious works and professor of English at Gordon College in Wenham, Massachusetts.

Borgman is a specialist in biblical narrative. He received his B.A. from Wheaton College an M.A. from Southern Illinois University and a Ph.D. from the University of Chicago.

Books
Borgman's books include: 
Genesis: The Story We Haven't Heard
The Way according to Luke: Hearing the Whole Story of Luke Acts 
David, Saul, and God: Rediscovering An Ancient Masterpiece
Written to Be Heard: Recovering the Messages of the Gospels (with Kelly James Clark)

References

External links 
www.paulborgman.net

1940 births
Living people
Wheaton College (Illinois) alumni
Southern Illinois University alumni
Gordon College (Massachusetts) faculty
University of Chicago alumni